Parotis suralis is a moth of the family Crambidae. The species was first described by Julius Lederer in 1863. It is found around the west Pacific Rim, including the Chagos Islands, Hong Kong, Japan, Kiribati, Tuvalu and the tropical far north of Queensland.

External links

Spilomelinae
Moths of Japan
Moths described in 1863